= Vaudois =

Vaudois can refer to:

- Waldensians, members of a Christian sect also known as Vaudois
- People who live in the canton of Vaud, Switzerland
  - A Franco-Provençal language dialect spoken in Vaud
